Manford is a surname. Notable people with the surname include:

Donald Manford (1934–1991), American politician
Jason Manford (born 1981), English comedian, singer, television presenter, and actor
Jeanne Manford (1920–2013), American activist

English-language surnames